Willowvale is a town in Amathole District Municipality in the Eastern Cape province of South Africa.

Town in Gcalekaland, 32 km southeast of Idutywa. It was established as a military post in 1879 and so named because of its situation on a stream with willow trees on its banks.

Notable people 
 Chief Derrick Mgwebi "Aa! Daliwonga!", the Chief and elder in Xhisa Kingdom; and former South African military commander and Lieutenant General
 Ace Ncobo, former South African football (soccer) referee.
 King Ahlangene Sigcawu "Aa! Vulikhaya!", the King of the Xhosa Kingdom.
 King  Bungeni Zwelidumile Sigcawu "Aa! Zwelidumile!", the King of the Xhosa Kingdom.
 King Xolilizwe Mzikayise Sigcawu "Aa! Xolilizwe!", the King of the Xhosa Kingdom.
 King  Zwelonke Sigcawu "Aa! Zwelonke!", the King of the Xhosa Kingdom.

References

Populated places in the Mbhashe Local Municipality